The 1958 Northwestern Wildcats team represented Northwestern University during the 1958 Big Ten Conference football season. In their third year under head coach Ara Parseghian, the Wildcats compiled a 5–4 record (3–4 against Big Ten Conference opponents), finished in seventh place in the Big Ten, and outscored their opponents by a combined total of 199 to 148.

Schedule

References

Northwestern
Northwestern Wildcats football seasons
Northwestern Wildcats football